Hernán Dario Legizamón (born 30 October 1969) is an Argentine rower. He competed in the men's lightweight coxless four event at the 1996 Summer Olympics.

References

External links
 

1969 births
Living people
Argentine male rowers
Olympic rowers of Argentina
Rowers at the 1996 Summer Olympics
Place of birth missing (living people)
Pan American Games silver medalists for Argentina
Medalists at the 1995 Pan American Games
Rowers at the 1995 Pan American Games
Pan American Games medalists in rowing